Elliot Benchetrit (born 2 October 1998) is a Moroccan tennis player who formerly represented France.  Since 1 January 2021 Benchetrit started to represent Morocco. His highest singles ranking was No. 198 on 10 February 2020, and his highest doubles ranking was  No. 198 on 10 June 2019. He has won three singles titles on the ITF Men's Circuit, and two doubles titles, as well as another doubles title on the ATP Challenger Tour.

Tennis career
He won his first ITF singles tournament in 2017 in Tunisia, and his first ITF doubles tournament the same year in Morocco, with Maxime Hamou.  

Benchetrit made his Grand Slam main-draw debut at the 2018 French Open, after receiving a wildcard to the singles main draw. He was defeated by fellow Frenchman Gaël Monfils in four sets in the first round. The following year at the 2019 French Open he also received wildcards in both singles and doubles and won his first round matches in both events.

Banana incident at the 2020 Australian Open
On 19 January 2020, while competing in the qualifiers for the 2020 Australian Open, 21-year-old  Benchetrit asked a teenage ball girl to get him a banana. Upon being handed the banana, Benchetrit told the ball girl “I can't do it,” indicating that he himself was unable to peel the banana due to his fingers being "heavily taped" due to blisters (or "heavily bandaged" as some outlets reported), and him having put cream on his hands in order not to sweat, and requested that she peel it for him. The chair umpire intervened, ordering Benchetrit to peel the banana himself, and, according to Benchetrit, telling him that the ball girl "was not his slave." Benchetrit went on to defeat his opponent and qualify for the main tournament, where he lost in the first round. The incident triggered debate on social media and within the ranks of tennis about the role of ball girls and ball boys. Benchetrit later expressed his disbelief at the umpire's statement to him, and the social media response "without people knowing what really happened".

Personal life

He was born in Nice, France, and lives in Morocco.

Benchetrit is of Moroccan descent through his father.

ITF Circuit finals

Singles: 7 (5–2)

Doubles: 5 (3–2)
{|
|- valign=top
|

References

External links

1998 births
Living people
Sportspeople from Nice
French male tennis players
Moroccan male tennis players
Competitors at the 2022 Mediterranean Games
Mediterranean Games bronze medalists for Morocco
Mediterranean Games medalists in tennis
French sportspeople of Moroccan descent
Bananas in popular culture